Wilson Israel Harris (born November 28, 1999) is an American professional soccer player who plays as a forward for Louisville City FC in the USL Championship.

Club career
Born in Los Angeles, California, Harris began his career in the U.S. Soccer Development Academy with Real So Cal in 2011 before having a short stint in the youth academy of Seattle Sounders FC in 2016. He then returned to Real So Cal before joining the Sporting Kansas City youth academy in 2017. On March 13, 2018, it was announced that Harris had committed to playing college soccer with the Louisville Cardinals.

Harris made his senior debut on May 5, 2018, for Sporting Kansas City's reserve side, Swope Park Rangers, in the USL Championship against OKC Energy. He came on as an 81st-minute substitute during 1–0 victory. Harris scored his first professional goal on June 17 against Fresno FC, a consolation goal in the 86th minute of a 4–1 defeat. He would go on to end his first season with Swope Park with 3 goals in 15 appearances. On July 3, 2018, Harris signed a professional contract with Swope Park Rangers, opting out of playing with the Louisville Cardinals.

The next season, Harris scored 12 goals from 25 games for Swope Park Rangers. On May 17, 2019, Harris joined Swope Park's parent club, Sporting Kansas City, on a short-term loan due to injuries in the first team. The next day, Harris appeared on the bench for Sporting Kansas City during a 1–1 draw against the Vancouver Whitecaps FC, but did not come on as a substitute. On September 21, 2019, Harris scored a brace for Swope Park Rangers against the Charlotte Independence during a 3–0 victory.

In 2020, Harris continued his scoring for the newly named Sporting Kansas City II, scoring 8 goals in 16 matches during a COVID-19 effected season. At the end the season, Harris was named the USL Championship Young Player of the Year.

Sporting Kansas City
On October 21, 2020, Harris signed a homegrown player deal with Sporting Kansas City ahead of the 2021 season.

Following the 2021 season, Harris' contract option was declined by Kansas City.

Louisville City FC
Harris joined USL Championship club Louisville City on February 3, 2022.

International career
Harris has represented the United States at the under-16, under-18, and under-20 teams.

Career statistics

Honours
Individual
 USL Championship Young Player of the Year: 2020

References

External links
 Profile at Major League Soccer

1999 births
Living people
American soccer players
Association football forwards
Sporting Kansas City II players
Sporting Kansas City players
Louisville City FC players
USL Championship players
Homegrown Players (MLS)
Soccer players from Los Angeles